Baddinsgill is a hamlet in the Scottish Borders area of Scotland. The Baddinsgill Reservoir is a few hundred metres north of the hamlet.

See also
List of places in the Scottish Borders
List of places in Scotland

External links
RCAHMS record of Baddinsgill in the Parish of Linton
RCAHMS record of Baddinsgill House (Cairnmuir)
RCAHMS record of Baddinsgill Reservoir

Villages in the Scottish Borders
Hamlets in Scotland